Senator Shaffer may refer to:

Brandon Shaffer (born 1971), Colorado State Senate
Harry G. Shaffer (politician) (1885–1971), West Virginia State Senate
Tim Shaffer (born 1945), Pennsylvania State Senate

See also
Senator Schaefer (disambiguation)
Senator Schaffer (disambiguation)
Senator Shafer (disambiguation)